The Sipiso-piso is a plunge waterfall in the Batak highlands of Sumatra, Indonesia. It is formed by a small underground river of the Karo plateau that falls from a cave in the side of caldera of Lake Toba, some  down to lake level. Sipiso-piso is a well-known tourist attraction and a nearby vantage point offers views of the falls and lake.

Sipiso-piso waterfall is located in the Tanah Karo regency in North Sumatra, at the northernmost tip of the Lake Toba caldera, near the fishing village of Tongging.

References

Landforms of Sumatra
Waterfalls of Indonesia
Landforms of North Sumatra
Tourist attractions in North Sumatra